Nine Lives is the ninth album by Bonnie Raitt, released in 1986. It was Raitt's most difficult release, due to the poor sales, negative reviews, and general circumstances surrounding its release.

History

"In 1983 there was a corporate sweep at Warner's, coming from upstairs, and they needed to trim the fat," Raitt recalled in 1990. "I just had completed an album called Tongue & Groove, which was produced by Rob Fraboni, who had also done Green Light. And I don't think they maliciously said, 'Let's let her finish her album and get the tour all lined up and print the covers and hire the people to do the video and then drop her.' You know, ha, ha, ha. But that's what they did. It was literally the day after I had finished mastering it. I had already finished the album once, and [Warner's claimed] the Jerry Williams tune would be more commercial if it didn't have quite as reggae a beat. Or something like that. So I went in and redid it. I thought if I cooperated a little more, maybe they'd promote the album more. But instead they dropped me and pulled the rug out from under my tour. I thought the way they did it was real crummy. They sent a letter. I think I suffered from not having a relationship with the A&R department there, because I had an independent production deal..."

Raitt could have purchased the master tapes and released the album elsewhere, but Warner's asking price was considered too high. "They told me I can take the tapes and shop them around," said Raitt, "but they wanted about $500,000 for them, and nobody wanted to pay that much..."

The material for Tongue & Groove was shelved until two years later when "Warner's suddenly said they were going to put the record out," Raitt recalled. "I said it wasn't really fair. I think at this point they felt kind of bad. I mean, I was out there touring on my savings to keep my name up, and my ability to draw was less and less. So they agreed to let me go in and recut half of it." The result was Nine Lives, which was finally released in 1986.

Track listing
"No Way to Treat a Lady" (Bryan Adams, Jim Vallance) – 3:51
"Runnin' Back to Me" (Karla Bonoff, Ira Ingber) – 4:14
"Who but a Fool (Thief Into Paradise)" (Nan O'Byrne, Tom Snow) – 4:26
"Crime of Passion" (Danny Ironstone, Mary Unobsky) – 4:20
"All Day, All Night" (James "Hutch" Hutchinson, Ronald Jones, Ivan Neville) – 4:03
"Stand Up to the Night" (Will Jennings, Richard Kerr, J.A.C. Redford) – 4:43
"Excited" (Jerry Lynn Williams) – 3:12
"Freezin' (For a Little Human Love)" (Michael Smotherman) – 4:58
"True Love Is Hard to Find" (Frederick Hibbert) – 4:34
"Angel" (Eric Kaz) – 4:00

Personnel 
 Bonnie Raitt – lead vocals, guitar (2), backing vocals (3, 4, 9), slide guitar (3, 10), acoustic guitar (9) 
 Michael Landau – guitar solo (1, 5), guitar (2, 4)
 Dean Parks – guitar (1, 2, 4, 5)
 Ira Ingber – guitar (2), backing vocals (3)
 Charles Ferrin – guitar (3)
 David Kitay – guitar (6), drum programming (6)
 Johnny Lee Schell – guitar (7-10), backing vocals (9)
 Bill Payne – acoustic piano (1), keyboards (1, 2, 4)
 Richard "Koz" Kosinski – keyboards (6)
 J.A.C Redford – keyboards (6)
 Guy Moon – additional keyboards (6)
 Ian McLagan – keyboards (7-10)
 Eric Kaz – acoustic piano (10)
 Nathan East – bass (1, 3)
 Neil Stubenhaus – bass (2, 5)
 Leland Sklar – bass (4)
 Ray Ohara – bass (7, 8, 9)
 John Robinson – drums (1, 2)
 Russ Kunkel – drums (3)
 Carlos Vega – drums (4, 5)
 Ian Wallace – drums (7-10)
 Lenny Castro – percussion (3, 5)
 Tower of Power – horns (2, 3)
 Greg Adams – trumpet, flugelhorn, horn arrangements
 Emilio Castillo – tenor saxophone
 Richard Elliot – alto saxophone, tenor saxophone
 Stephen "Doc" Kupka – baritone saxophone
 Lee Thornburg – trombone, trumpet, flugelhorn
 Rosemary Butler – backing vocals (1, 3-6)
 Max Carl – backing vocals (1, 3-6)
 Ivan Neville – backing vocals (5)
 Blondie Chaplin – backing vocals (7, 9, 10)
 Stephen Ross – backing vocals (7, 10)
 Sippie Wallace – backing vocals (9)
 Christine McVie – backing vocals (10)
 Todd Sharp – backing vocals (10)

Production 
 Producers – George Massenburg and Bill Payne (Tracks 1-5); Russ Kunkel (Track 3); Steve Tyrell (Track 6); Rob Fraboni (Tracks 7-10).
 Engineers – George Massenburg (Tracks 1-5); David Kitay (Track 6); Terry Becker and Rob Fraboni (Tracks 7-10).
 Assistant Engineers – Sharon Rice, John X. Volaitis and Billy Youdelman.
 Mixing – George Massenburg (Tracks 1-5); David Tickle (Tracks 7-10).
 Mastered by Doug Sax at The Mastering Lab (Los Angeles, CA).
 Project Coordinator – Jo Motta
 Production Coordination – Ivy Skoff
 Art Direction and Design – Laura LiPuma
 Cover Illustration – Lindsey Loch
 Photography – Jim Shea
 Wardrobe – Margie Kent
 Make-up – Denise Pauly
 Management – Danny Goldberg and Ron Stone

Charts
Album - Billboard (United States)

Singles - Billboard (United States)

References

Bonnie Raitt albums
1986 albums
Albums produced by Rob Fraboni
Albums produced by Bill Payne
Albums produced by Russ Kunkel
Albums produced by George Massenburg
Warner Records albums